Roma or Romang is a Malayo-Polynesian language spoken by about 1,700 people (in 1991) in Jersusu village on Romang island in Maluku, Indonesia.

References

Timor–Babar languages
Languages of Indonesia